Wallace Mills is an unincorporated community in Scioto County, in the U.S. state of Ohio.

History
The community's namesake Wallace Mills was a watermill built in 1844. A post office called Wallace Mills was established in 1879, and remained in operation until 1904.

References

Unincorporated communities in Scioto County, Ohio
Unincorporated communities in Ohio